Panic On is the second album by indie pop band Madder Rose, released in March 1994 on Atlantic Records.

Recording
The album was recorded with, and co-produced by, Mark Freegard at Waterfront Studios in Hoboken, New Jersey. According to Madder Rose guitarist Billy Cote, the band recorded Panic On just after they had finished touring, and had only ten days to prepare for the recording sessions. He has also said that it was very easy to record the album's songs. After the album was recorded, the band's bassist, Matt Verta-Ray, left the band, whereupon they had five weeks to choose a new one; they settled on Chris Giammalvo from Eve's Plum.

Critical reception

Among the many critics who reviewed Panic On favorably was Rolling Stones Kara Manning, who wrote that it "beautifully blends poetry and mayhem" and gave it 4 out of 5 stars. Robert Christgau, however, was less complimentary, awarding the album a "neither", which, according to him, denotes an album that "may impress once or twice with consistent craft or an arresting track or two. Then it won't."

Track listing
 Sleep, Forever
 Car Song
 Panic On
 What Holly Sees
 Almost Lost My Mind
 Drop A Bomb
 Ultra Anxiety (Teenage Style)
 Happy New Year
 Day In, Day Out
 Margaret
 Foolish Ways
 Black Eye Town
 When You Smile
 Mad Dog

Personnel
Dave Battelene—Assistant Engineer
Diane Carpentieri—Design, Flute
Billy Coté—Artwork, Composer, Cover Art, Guitar, Guitar (Rhythm), Slide Guitar, Vibraphone
Greg Di Gesu—Assistant Engineer
Mark Freegard—Engineer, Mini Moog, Mixing, Producer 
Ted Jensen—Mastering
Johnny Kick—Artwork, Composer, Drums, Organ, Piano, Vibraphone, Vocals (Background)
Rich Lamb—Assistant Engineer, Mixing Assistant
Mary Lorson—Collage, Composer, Guitar, Organ, Piano, Vocals
Madder Rose—Primary Artist, Producer
Jeff Mauriello—Assistant Engineer	
Robert Musso—Engineer, Producer
Tom Sheehan—Photography
Matt Verta-Ray—Artwork, Bass, Composer, Cover Art, Guitar, Organ, Vibraphone, Violin, Vocals (Background)
Steve Yegelwel—A&R

References

1994 albums
Atlantic Records albums
Madder Rose albums